List of plankton species in the genus Navicula.

Species 
, Algaebase lists 1280 accepted species and more than 1900 proposed species in the plankton genus Navicula. They include:

A 

Navicula abbotti
Navicula abbottii
Navicula abbreviata
Navicula abdita
Navicula abducta
Navicula abelioensis
Navicula aberrans
Navicula abica
Navicula abiskoensis
Navicula aboensis
Navicula abonuensis
Navicula abraensis
Navicula abrupta  
Navicula abscondita
Navicula abstrusa 
Navicula abuensis
Navicula abunda 
Navicula abundoides
Navicula acacia
Navicula accedens
Navicula accommoda
Navicula accurata 
Navicula achthera 
Navicula acephala 
Navicula achnanthoides 
Navicula achthera
Navicula acidobionta 
Navicula acidobiontica 
Navicula acidophila
Navicula acrosphaeria
Navicula actinota
Navicula acus
Navicula acuta
Navicula acuticuneata
Navicula acuticuneatula 
Navicula acutirostris 
Navicula acutissima
Navicula acutissima
Navicula adakensis
Navicula adakensis
Navicula adamantiformis
Navicula adamata
Navicula addae
Navicula admenda
Navicula adami
Navicula adampeensis
Navicula adamsii
Navicula addaae
Navicula addae
Navicula addicta
Navicula admenda
Navicula adminensis 
Navicula adnatoides
Navicula adonis
Navicula adumbrata 
Navicula advena
Navicula adversa
Navicula adversatrix
Navicula aedifex
Navicula aegyptiaca
Navicula aemula
Navicula aequalis  
Navicula aequinoctialis
Navicula aequora
Navicula aequoria
Navicula aestimata
Navicula aestiva
Navicula affinis 
Navicula affirmata
Navicula africana
Navicula agatkae
Navicula agma
Navicula agellus
Navicula aggerica
Navicula aggesta
Navicula aglaos
Navicula agnita 
Navicula agma
Navicula agmastriata
Navicula agnewii
Navicula agnita
Navicula agrestiformis  
Navicula agulhasica
Navicula ahmedabadensis 
Navicula aikenenses
Navicula aikenensis
Navicula airdevronsixii
Navicula aitchelbee
Navicula ajajensis
Navicula aikensis
Navicula airdevronsixii
Navicula ajajensis
Navicula ajenaensis
Navicula aketechiensis
Navicula albanica 
Navicula akimensis
Navicula aktinoides
Navicula alaskana
Navicula alea  
Navicula aleemi
Navicula algor
Navicula aleemii
Navicula algeriensis
Navicula aleksandrae
Navicula algida
Navicula algor
Navicula alineae
Navicula alisoviana
Navicula altiplanensis
Navicula alineae
Navicula alisoviana
Navicula allista
Navicula allmaniana
Navicula allorgei
Navicula alpestris
Navicula alpha
Navicula alpina
Navicula alternans
Navicula alterofasciata
Navicula altiplanensis
Navicula amabilis
Navicula ambigua 
Navicula americana
Navicula amerinda
Navicula amica
Navicula amicii
Navicula amicorum
Navicula ammophila
Navicula amnicola
Navicula amoena
Navicula amoena
Navicula amoenaeformis
Navicula amphibola
Navicula amphiceropsis
Navicula amphiceros
Navicula amphilepta
Navicula amphirhychus
Navicula amphirhynchus
Navicula amphirrhina
Navicula amphirhychus
Navicula amphisphenia
Navicula amphistylus
Navicula amphoroides
Navicula ampliata
Navicula amygdalina
Navicula anassae
Navicula anatis
Navicula anca
Navicula anceps 
Navicula ancilla
Navicula ancilla
Navicula ancisa
Navicula ancora
Navicula anderabensis
Navicula anderssonii
Navicula andesitica
Navicula andicola
Navicula andium
Navicula andrussowii
Navicula anenuta
Navicula angelica
Navicula angelorum
Navicula angleana
Navicula anglica 
Navicula anglophila
Navicula angolensis
Navicula angulati
Navicula angulosa
Navicula angarae  
Navicula angelica
Navicula angulosa
Navicula angusta
Navicula anguste-fasciata
Navicula angustissima
Navicula anhuiensis
Navicula anna
Navicula ankobraensis
Navicula annexa
Navicula annulana 
Navicula anopaia
Navicula antarctica
Navicula antarctica
Navicula antediluviana
Navicula antediluvianum
Navicula anthracis
Navicula antigua
Navicula antillarum
Navicula antiqua
Navicula antonii
Navicula antonioides
Navicula aparta
Navicula aperta
Navicula apia
Navicula apiculata
Navicula antediluvianum
Navicula antigua
Navicula antiqua
Navicula antonii
Navicula antonioides
Navicula antverpiensis
Navicula apiculata
Navicula apiculatoreinhardtii
Navicula applicita
Navicula applicitoides
Navicula approximatella
Navicula aquaedurae
Navicula applicitoides
Navicula approximata 
Navicula apsteinii
Navicula apta
Navicula aquaeductae
Navicula aquitaniae
Navicula aquitaniae
Navicula aquosa
Navicula aradina
Navicula aranaria
Navicula arata
Navicula araucaniana
Navicula arcana
Navicula archeriana
Navicula archibaldiana
Navicula arcta
Navicula arctica
Navicula arctotenelloides
Navicula arcuata
Navicula ardis
Navicula ardua
Navicula arenaria
Navicula archeriana
Navicula arctotenelloides
Navicula applanata
Navicula applicita
Navicula appendiculata
Navicula arenariaeformis
Navicula arenicola
Navicula arenosa
Navicula arenaria
Navicula arenariaeformis
Navicula arenicola
Navicula arenula
Navicula argens
Navicula argunensis
Navicula argutiola
Navicula ariiensis
Navicula arkona
Navicula armata
Navicula armoricana
Navicula arenula
Navicula areschougiana
Navicula argens
Navicula arguens
Navicula argunensis
Navicula argutiola
Navicula arkona
Navicula armata
Navicula armoricana
Navicula arraniensis
Navicula artemidis
Navicula artificiosa
Navicula arvensiformis
Navicula arvensis
Navicula arverna
Navicula aspergilla
Navicula associata
Navicula asymbasia
Navicula arvensoides
Navicula arverna
Navicula asanwinsoensis
Navicula ashantiensis
Navicula asiatica
Navicula asklepieionensis
Navicula aspera
Navicula aspergilla
Navicula aspersa
Navicula asperula
Navicula associata
Navicula assula
Navicula assuloides
Navicula assymetrica
Navicula astrolabensis
Navicula asymbasia
Navicula asymetrica
Navicula asymmetrica
Navicula atacamana
Navicula atacamae
Navicula atasensis
Navicula athenae
Navicula atlantica
Navicula atwateri
Navicula arvensoides
Navicula arverna
Navicula asanwinsoensis
Navicula ashantiensis
Navicula asiatica
Navicula asklepieionensis
Navicula aspera
Navicula aspergilla
Navicula aspersa
Navicula asperula
Navicula associata
Navicula assula
Navicula assuloides
Navicula assymetrica
Navicula astrolabensis
Navicula asymbasia
Navicula asymetrica
Navicula asymmetrica
Navicula atacamae
Navicula atacamana
Navicula atalos
Navicula athenae
Navicula atlantica
Navicula atomarius
Navicula atomoides
Navicula atomus
Navicula atomus
Navicula atwateri
Navicula aubertii
Navicula aucklandica
Navicula aueri
Navicula aulacophaena
Navicula aurangabadensis
Navicula aurantiaca
Navicula aurora
Navicula australica
Navicula australomediocris
Navicula australoceanica
Navicula australoshetlandica
Navicula austrocollegarum
Navicula avenaceoides
Navicula avonensis

B 

Navicula baardsethii
Navicula baccata
Navicula bacillaris 
Navicula bacillifera 
Navicula bacilliformis 
Navicula bacillum 
Navicula bacterium 
Navicula bacula 
Navicula bahiensis 
Navicula bahuensoides
Navicula bahusiensis 
Navicula baileyana 
Navicula baileyi 
Navicula bainii 
Navicula balcanica 
Navicula balnearis 
Navicula bamboiensis 
Navicula bannajensis
Navicula bansoensis 
Navicula barbadense 
Navicula barbadensis 
Navicula barbara 
Navicula barbarica 
Navicula barberiana 
Navicula barbitos 
Navicula barclayana 
Navicula barentsii 
Navicula barkeriana
Navicula barklayana 
Navicula barodensis 
Navicula barrowiana 
Navicula bartholomei 
Navicula basaltaeproxima 
Navicula basilica 
Navicula basillica 
Navicula bastianii 
Navicula bastowii 
Navicula bauemleri 
Navicula bauemlerii 
Navicula bawdiaensis 
Navicula bayleana 
Navicula bdesma 
Navicula beaufortiana
Navicula beccariana 
Navicula beckii 
Navicula begeri 
Navicula begerii
Navicula beketowii
Navicula bella 
Navicula bellatii 
Navicula belliatula
Navicula bellissima 
Navicula belsesiensis 
Navicula bendaensis 
Navicula bengalensis 
Navicula bergenensis 
Navicula bergeni 
Navicula bergerii 
Navicula berriati 
Navicula bertelsenii
Navicula bertrandi 
Navicula besarensis 
Navicula beta
Navicula beyrichiana 
Navicula biaculeata 
Navicula biakensis 
Navicula bicapitata 
Navicula bicapitellata 
Navicula bicarinata 
Navicula bicephala 
Navicula bicephaloides 
Navicula biceps 
Navicula biclavata 
Navicula biconica 
Navicula biconifera 
Navicula biconstricta 
Navicula bicontracta 
Navicula bicuneolus 
Navicula bicuspidata 
Navicula biddulphioides
Navicula bidentula 
Navicula bievexa
Navicula bifax 
Navicula bifissa 
Navicula biflexa 
Navicula bifurcatula 
Navicula bigemmata
Navicula biglobosa 
Navicula bilineata 
Navicula bilobata 
Navicula bimaculata 
Navicula binaria 
Navicula binodis
Navicula binodulosa
Navicula bintila
Navicula bioculata
Navicula bipectinalis 
Navicula bipunctata 
Navicula bipunctata 
Navicula bipustulata 
Navicula birhis 
Navicula birostrata 
Navicula birostris 
Navicula biscalaris 
Navicula biseriata 
Navicula biskanterae
Navicula biskanteri 
Navicula bistriata 
Navicula bisulcata 
Navicula bita 
Navicula bituminosa 
Navicula biwaensis 
Navicula bjoernoeyaensis 
Navicula blasii 
Navicula bleischiana 
Navicula bleischii 
Navicula blessingii 
Navicula blotii 
Navicula bodosensis 
Navicula boeckii 
Navicula boergesenii 
Navicula bogotensis 
Navicula bolleana 
Navicula bombiformis 
Navicula bomboides 
Navicula bombus 
Navicula bongrainii 
Navicula bonnieri 
Navicula borbassii
Navicula borealis
Navicula borinquensis 
Navicula borneoensis 
Navicula borowkae 
Navicula borrichii 
Navicula borussica 
Navicula boryana 
Navicula boseana 
Navicula bossvikensis 
Navicula bosumtwiensis
Navicula botteriana 
Navicula bottnica 
Navicula boudetii 
Navicula bouhardi 
Navicula bourgi
Navicula bourrellyi
Navicula bourrellyivera 
Navicula boyei
Navicula bozenae 
Navicula branchiata 
Navicula brasiliana 
Navicula brasiliensis 
Navicula braunii 
Navicula brebissonii 
Navicula breenii
Navicula brehmi 
Navicula brehmii
Navicula brehmioides 
Navicula breitenbuchii 
Navicula brekkaensis 
Navicula bremensis 
Navicula bremeyeri 
Navicula breviata 
Navicula brevirostrata 
Navicula brevis 
Navicula brevissima
Navicula brockmanni 
Navicula brockmannii 
Navicula broetzii
Navicula bruchi 
Navicula bruchii 
Navicula brunelii 
Navicula bruni 
Navicula brunii
Navicula bruyanti 
Navicula bryophila
Navicula bryophiloides 
Navicula buccella 
Navicula buchansiana 
Navicula budayana 
Navicula budda 
Navicula budensis 
Navicula buderiformis 
Navicula bullata
Navicula bulnheimii 
Navicula burcki 
Navicula bushmanorum 
Navicula butreensis

C 

Navicula caddoensis
Navicula caenosus
Navicula calcuttensis
Navicula calcuttensis
Navicula caldwellii
Navicula calida
Navicula californica
Navicula caliginosa
Navicula calva
Navicula calvata
Navicula camerata
Navicula campanilae
Navicula campbellii
Navicula campylodiscus
Navicula canaliculata
Navicula canalis
Navicula canariana
Navicula cancelleta 
Navicula candida
Navicula cantonatii
Navicula cantonensis
Navicula capensis
Navicula capillata
Navicula capitata
Navicula capitatoradiata
Navicula capitellata
Navicula capitoradiata
Navicula capitulata
Navicula capsa
Navicula capsula
Navicula caractacus
Navicula carassius
Navicula cardinaliculus
Navicula cardinalis
Navicula carecti
Navicula cari 
Navicula caribaea
Navicula carinata
Navicula carinifera
Navicula cariocincta
Navicula carissima
Navicula carloffii
Navicula carminata
Navicula carolinensis
Navicula carpathorum
Navicula carstensenii
Navicula carteri
Navicula carvajaliana
Navicula casca
Navicula cascadensis
Navicula casertana
Navicula cassieana
Navicula castracanei
Navicula catalanogermanica
Navicula cataracta-rheni
Navicula cataractarum
Navicula catarinensis
Navicula caterva
Navicula catharinae
Navicula caupulus
Navicula cavernae
Navicula ceciliae
Navicula celinei
Navicula cellesensis
Navicula cendronii
Navicula centraster
Navicula centropunctata
Navicula cephalodes
Navicula ceratogramma
Navicula ceratostigma
Navicula ceres
Navicula cerneutia
Navicula cesatii
Navicula ceylanensis
Navicula chaberti
Navicula chadwickii
Navicula chandolensis
Navicula charlatii 
Navicula charlottae
Navicula charontis
Navicula chasei
Navicula chasmaensis
Navicula chasmigera
Navicula chaspula
Navicula chassagnei
Navicula chauhanii
Navicula cherubim
Navicula chi
Navicula chiarae
Navicula chiengmaiensis
Navicula chilena
Navicula chilensis
Navicula chimmoana
Navicula chinensis
Navicula chingmaiensis
Navicula chloridorum
Navicula cholnokyana
Navicula cholnokyii
Navicula chordata
Navicula chrissiana
Navicula chutteri
Navicula chyzerii
Navicula ciliata
Navicula cimex
Navicula cincta 
Navicula cinctaeformis
Navicula cingens
Navicula cingulatoides
Navicula cinna
Navicula circumnodosa
Navicula circumtexta
Navicula circumvallata
Navicula cistella
Navicula citrea
Navicula citriformis
Navicula clagesii
Navicula clamans 
Navicula clarensiana
Navicula claromontensis
Navicula clathrata
Navicula clavata 
Navicula claviana
Navicula claytoni
Navicula claytonii
Navicula clementis 
Navicula clementoides
Navicula climacospheniae
Navicula cluthensis 
Navicula cluthensoides
Navicula clypeus
Navicula coarctata
Navicula coccinella
Navicula cocconeiformis 
Navicula cocconeoides
Navicula cocconioides
Navicula coccus
Navicula cochlearis
Navicula coei
Navicula coelata
Navicula coerulea
Navicula coffeiformis 
Navicula colii
Navicula collersonii
Navicula collertsonii
Navicula collisiana
Navicula columbiana
Navicula columnaris
Navicula comerei
Navicula commixta
Navicula commutabilis
Navicula commutata
Navicula comoides
Navicula compacta
Navicula compar
Navicula comperei
Navicula complanata
Navicula complanatoides
Navicula completa 1
Navicula completaoides
Navicula compositestriata 
Navicula compressicauda
Navicula concamerata
Navicula concentrica
Navicula concilians
Navicula concinna
Navicula confecta
Navicula confervacea 
Navicula confidens
Navicula congerana
Navicula congolensis
Navicula congrua
Navicula conjugata
Navicula conjuncta
Navicula connectens
Navicula conops
Navicula consanguinea
Navicula conscensa
Navicula consentanea
Navicula consimilis
Navicula consors
Navicula conspersa
Navicula constans
Navicula constantinii
Navicula constricta
Navicula contempta
Navicula contenta 
Navicula contentaeformis
Navicula contermina
Navicula contigua
Navicula contorta
Navicula contortula
Navicula contracta
Navicula contraria
Navicula controversa
Navicula conveniens
Navicula convergens
Navicula conveyi
Navicula copiosa
Navicula coquedensis
Navicula coraliana
Navicula corbieri
Navicula cordillerae
Navicula cornubiensis
Navicula coronensis 
Navicula corpulenta
Navicula correpta
Navicula corrugata
Navicula cortanensis
Navicula corticola
Navicula corymbosa
Navicula cosmaria
Navicula costata
Navicula costei 
Navicula costulata 
Navicula costuloides
Navicula cotiformis
Navicula couperi
Navicula crabro 
Navicula crabroniformis
Navicula crassirostris
Navicula crassula
Navicula crassulexigua
Navicula crassuliexigua
Navicula crateri
Navicula craticula
Navicula craticularis
Navicula craveni
Navicula creguti
Navicula cremeri 
Navicula cremorne
Navicula crepitacula
Navicula creuzbergensis
Navicula criophila
Navicula crispa
Navicula cristula 
Navicula crocodili
Navicula cronullensis
Navicula crucialis
Navicula cruciata 
Navicula crucifera
Navicula crucifix
Navicula cruciformis 
Navicula crucigera
Navicula crucigeriformis
Navicula crux
Navicula cruxmeridionalis
Navicula cryophila
Navicula cryptocephala 
Navicula cryptocephaloides
Navicula cryptofallax
Navicula cryptonella
Navicula cryptorrhynchus
Navicula cryptostriata
Navicula cryptotenella
Navicula cryptotenelloides
Navicula csaszkaae
Navicula cubitus
Navicula cumbriensis
Navicula cumvibia
Navicula cunctans
Navicula curiosa
Navicula cursoria
Navicula curta
Navicula curtestria
Navicula curtisterna
Navicula curvilineata
Navicula curvinervia
Navicula curvipunctata
Navicula cuspidata 
Navicula cuspis
Navicula cuvella
Navicula cyclophora
Navicula cyclops
Navicula cymatopleura
Navicula cymbelliformis
Navicula cymbelloides
Navicula cymbula
Navicula cyprinus
Navicula czekehazensis

D 

Navicula dactylus 
Navicula dahomensis 
Navicula dahurica 
Navicula dailyi 
Navicula dalmatica 
Navicula damasii 
Navicula damongensis 
Navicula dariana 
Navicula dartevellei 
Navicula darwiniana 
Navicula davidsoniana 
Navicula de-toniana 
Navicula de-wittiana 
Navicula dealpina 
Navicula debegenica 
Navicula debilis 
Navicula debilissima 
Navicula debilitata 
Navicula deblockii 
Navicula debyi 
Navicula dechambrei 
Navicula decipiens 
Navicula decissa 
Navicula declinata 
Navicula decora 
Navicula decrescens 
Navicula decumana 
Navicula decurrens 
Navicula decussata 
Navicula decussepunctata 
Navicula definita  
Navicula defluens 
Navicula degenii 
Navicula dehissa 
Navicula delastriata 
Navicula delata 
Navicula delawarensis 
Navicula delecta 
Navicula delginensis 
Navicula deliberata 
Navicula delicata 
Navicula delognei 
Navicula delpiroui 
Navicula delta 
Navicula deltaica 
Navicula demerara 
Navicula demerarae 
Navicula demeraroides 
Navicula demissa 
Navicula demta 
Navicula denizotii 
Navicula densa 
Navicula denselineolata 
Navicula densepunctata 
Navicula densestriata 
Navicula densilineolata 
Navicula densistriata 
Navicula densuensis 
Navicula denticulata 
Navicula denudata 
Navicula depauxii 
Navicula depressa 
Navicula derasa 
Navicula descripta 
Navicula deserti 
Navicula destituta 
Navicula detenta 
Navicula detersa 
Navicula diabolica 
Navicula diaculus 
Navicula diagonalis 
Navicula diahotana 
Navicula diaphana 
Navicula diaphanea 
Navicula dibola 
Navicula dicephala 
Navicula dicurvata 
Navicula didyma 
Navicula diengensis 
Navicula differta 
Navicula difficilis 
Navicula difficillima 
Navicula difficillimoides 
Navicula diffluens 
Navicula difformis 
Navicula diffusa 
Navicula dificilis 
Navicula digito 
Navicula digito-radiata 
Navicula digitoconvergens 
Navicula digitoradiata 
Navicula digitulus 
Navicula digna 
Navicula digrediens 
Navicula digtoradiata 
Navicula dilata 
Navicula dilatata 
Navicula dilucida 
Navicula dimidiata 
Navicula diomphala 
Navicula diploneiformis 
Navicula diplosticta 
Navicula directa 
Navicula dirhynchus 
Navicula dirrhombus 
Navicula discernenda 
Navicula disclusa 
Navicula discrepans 
Navicula disertoides 
Navicula disjuncta 
Navicula disjunctoides 
Navicula dispar 
Navicula disparalis 
Navicula disparata 
Navicula dispensata 
Navicula dispersa 
Navicula dispersepunctata 
Navicula dispersepunctulata 
Navicula disposita 
Navicula disputans 
Navicula dissimilis 
Navicula dissipata 
Navicula dissipata 
Navicula dissuta 
Navicula distans 
Navicula distantepunctata 
Navicula distauridium 
Navicula distenta 
Navicula disticha 
Navicula distincta 
Navicula distinctastriata 
Navicula distoma 
Navicula diuturna 
Navicula diuturnoides 
Navicula divaricata 
Navicula divergens 
Navicula diversa 
Navicula diversestriata 
Navicula diversipunctata 
Navicula diversistriata 
Navicula diverta 
Navicula dobrinatemniskovae 
Navicula dodowaensis 
Navicula doehleri 
Navicula doello-juradoi 
Navicula doeringii 
Navicula doljensis 
Navicula dolosa 
Navicula dolosa 
Navicula donkinia 
Navicula dorenbergi 
Navicula dorogostaiskyi 
Navicula dosseti-azpeitia 
Navicula dubia 
Navicula dubitata 
Navicula dubravicensis 
Navicula duerrenbergiana 
Navicula dugaensis 
Navicula dulcioides 
Navicula dulcis 
Navicula dumontiae 
Navicula dunstonii 
Navicula duomedia 
Navicula duplex 
Navicula duplicata 
Navicula duplocapitata 
Navicula durandii 
Navicula dutoitana 
Navicula dux 
Navicula dvorachekii 
Navicula dystrophica

E 

Navicula ebor
Navicula eburnea
Navicula ectoris
Navicula effrenata
Navicula egena
Navicula egeria
Navicula egregia
Navicula egyptiaca
Navicula ehrenbergii
Navicula ehrlichiae
Navicula eichhorniaephila
Navicula eichhorniophila
Navicula eidrigeana
Navicula eiowana
Navicula ekholmensis
Navicula el-kab
Navicula elaborata
Navicula elaphros
Navicula electa
Navicula electrolytifuga
Navicula elegans
Navicula elegantissima
Navicula elegantoides
Navicula elegantula
Navicula elenkinii
Navicula elephantis
Navicula elesdiana
Navicula elevata
Navicula elginensis 
Navicula elkab
Navicula ellips
Navicula ellipsis
Navicula elliptica
Navicula elmorei
Navicula elongata
Navicula elongatula
Navicula elpatievskyi
Navicula elsae-thum
Navicula elsoniana
Navicula emarginata
Navicula endophytica
Navicula engelbrechtii
Navicula ennediensis
Navicula entoleia
Navicula entomon
Navicula entzii
Navicula enucleata
Navicula eocaenica
Navicula episcopalis
Navicula eponka 
Navicula epsilon
Navicula equiornata
Navicula erdmannensis
Navicula ergadensis
Navicula erifuga
Navicula erosa
Navicula erythraea 
Navicula esamangensis
Navicula escambia
Navicula esoculus
Navicula esox
Navicula eta
Navicula eugeniae
Navicula eumontana
Navicula euryale
Navicula eurycephala
Navicula eurysoma
Navicula evexa
Navicula evulsa
Navicula exasperans
Navicula excavata
Navicula excavata
Navicula excellens
Navicula excentrica
Navicula excepta
Navicula exemta
Navicula exigua
Navicula exiguiformis
Navicula exiguoides
Navicula exiguoidis
Navicula exiliformis
Navicula exilior
Navicula exilis
Navicula exilissima
Navicula exillima
Navicula eximia
Navicula expecta
Navicula expectilis
Navicula expedita
Navicula expeditionis
Navicula explanata
Navicula expleta
Navicula explicata
Navicula explicatoides
Navicula explorata
Navicula eymei

F 

Navicula faba
Navicula faceta
Navicula facilis
Navicula falaisiensis
Navicula falax
Navicula falklandiae
Navicula fallax
Navicula falsalyra
Navicula famintzinii
Navicula faoensis
Navicula farakulumensis
Navicula farcimen
Navicula farta
Navicula fasciata
Navicula fatigans
Navicula fauta
Navicula fawumangensis
Navicula febigeri
Navicula febigerii
Navicula fennica
Navicula fennoscandica
Navicula fernandae
Navicula fernandesii
Navicula fernandi-koburg
Navicula ferrazae
Navicula festiva
Navicula feuerborni
Navicula feuerbornii
Navicula filarszkyana
Navicula filarszkyi
Navicula filholi
Navicula filiformis
Navicula finitima
Navicula finmarchica
Navicula finnmarchica
Navicula firma
Navicula fischeri
Navicula flabellata
Navicula flagellifera
Navicula flahaulti
Navicula flamma
Navicula flammarionensis
Navicula flammula
Navicula flanatica
Navicula flattii
Navicula flebilis
Navicula flexuosa
Navicula florentina
Navicula floridae
Navicula floridana
Navicula florinae
Navicula floriniae
Navicula fluens
Navicula fluitans
Navicula fluminensis
Navicula fluminisirtysch
Navicula fluminitica
Navicula fluviae-jenisseyi
Navicula foliola
Navicula folium
Navicula fontana
Navicula fontellii
Navicula fonticola
Navicula fontinalis
Navicula forcipata
Navicula formenterae
Navicula formicata
Navicula formicina
Navicula formosa
Navicula fortis
Navicula fortunata
Navicula fossilioides
Navicula fossilis
Navicula fragilarioides
Navicula fragilis
Navicula franciscae
Navicula frasnensis
Navicula fraudulenta
Navicula freesei
Navicula frenguellii
Navicula frequens
Navicula frickei
Navicula frickei
Navicula friesneri
Navicula frigida
Navicula frisiae
Navicula friska
Navicula fromenterae
Navicula frugalis
Navicula frustuliaeformis
Navicula frustuloides
Navicula fuchsii
Navicula fuegiana
Navicula fuegiana
Navicula fuenzalidae
Navicula fukiensis
Navicula fundata
Navicula funiculata
Navicula furtiva
Navicula fusca
Navicula fuscata
Navicula fusidium
Navicula fusiformis
Navicula fusiformis-vahliana
Navicula fusioides
Navicula fustis
Navicula fusus
Navicula futilis

G 

Navicula galapagoensis
Navicula galea
Navicula galikii
Navicula gallapagensis
Navicula gallica
Navicula galvagensis
Navicula gamma
Navicula gandhii
Navicula gandrupi
Navicula garganica
Navicula garkeana
Navicula gasilidei
Navicula gastriformis
Navicula gastroides
Navicula gastrum
Navicula gauthieri
Navicula gebhardi
Navicula gebhardii
Navicula geinitzi
Navicula geisslerae
Navicula geitleri
Navicula gelida
Navicula gemina
Navicula geminata
Navicula gemmata
Navicula gemmatula
Navicula gemmeta
Navicula gendrei
Navicula genevensis
Navicula geniculata
Navicula genifera
Navicula genovefae
Navicula genustriata
Navicula gerloffi
Navicula gerloffii
Navicula germanopolonica
Navicula geronimensis
Navicula gibba
Navicula gibberula
Navicula gibbosa
Navicula giebelii
Navicula gieskesii
Navicula gigantorum 
Navicula gigas
Navicula gilva
Navicula girodi
Navicula girondica
Navicula glaberrima
Navicula glaberrimum
Navicula glabra
Navicula glabrissima n
Navicula glabriuscula
Navicula glacialis
Navicula glaciei
Navicula glangeaudi
Navicula glans
Navicula glasovii
Navicula globiceps
Navicula globifera
Navicula globosa
Navicula globosaoides
Navicula globulifera
Navicula globuliferiformis
Navicula glomus
Navicula gloriosa
Navicula gloriosa
Navicula godfroyi
Navicula goeppertiana
Navicula goersii
Navicula gomontiana
Navicula gomphonemacea
Navicula gomphonemoides
Navicula gondwana
Navicula gonzalvesiana
Navicula gordonii
Navicula gorjanovicii
Navicula gothlandica
Navicula gotlandica
Navicula gottlandica
Navicula gourdonii
Navicula gouwsii
Navicula gracilis
Navicula gracillima
Navicula graciloides
Navicula gradata
Navicula gradatoides
Navicula graeffii
Navicula gralana
Navicula grammitis
Navicula granii
Navicula granoryza
Navicula granulata
Navicula granulifer
Navicula granum
Navicula granum-avenae
Navicula grasmueckii
Navicula grata
Navicula gratissima
Navicula gregaria
Navicula gregaria
Navicula gregaria
Navicula gregarioides
Navicula gregoriana
Navicula gregorii
Navicula gretharum
Navicula grevilleana
Navicula grevillei
Navicula grevilleoides
Navicula grevillii
Navicula grimmei
Navicula grimmeioides
Navicula grimmii
Navicula grimmioides
Navicula grippii
Navicula groenlandica
Navicula groschopfi
Navicula groschopfii
Navicula grovei
Navicula grudeensis
Navicula gruendleri
Navicula gruendleriana
Navicula grundtvigii
Navicula grunovii
Navicula grunowii
Navicula guadalupensis
Navicula guarujana
Navicula guatemalensis
Navicula guaynaboensis
Navicula guetharyana
Navicula guihotii
Navicula guinardiana
Navicula guluensis
Navicula gurovii
Navicula guttata
Navicula guttulifera
Navicula gutwinskii
Navicula gyrinida
Navicula gysigensis

H 

Navicula h-album
Navicula habena
Navicula habita
Navicula hagelsteinii
Navicula hahni
Navicula hahnii
Navicula halinae
Navicula halionata
Navicula halophila
Navicula halophiloides
Navicula hamiltonii
Navicula hamulifera
Navicula hangchowensis
Navicula hankae
Navicula hanseatica
Navicula hanseniana
Navicula hantkenii
Navicula haradaae
Navicula harbinensis
Navicula harderi
Navicula harpa
Navicula harrisoniana
Navicula hartii
Navicula hartzii
Navicula hasta
Navicula hastaeformis
Navicula hastata
Navicula hastatula
Navicula hauckii
Navicula haueri
Navicula hawaiensis
Navicula hawaiiensis
Navicula haynaldii
Navicula haytiana
Navicula hazslinszkyi
Navicula hebes
Navicula hecateia
Navicula heeri
Navicula heilprinensis
Navicula heimansioides
Navicula heimii
Navicula helea
Navicula helensoides
Navicula helmandensis
Navicula helminae
Navicula helvetica
Navicula hemiptera
Navicula hemiviridula
Navicula henckeli
Navicula hennedyi
Navicula hennedyii
Navicula henriquesii
Navicula herbstiae
Navicula heribaudi
Navicula hermanii
Navicula heteroflexa
Navicula heterostriata
Navicula heterovalvata
Navicula heufleri
Navicula heufleriana
Navicula hevesensis
Navicula hexapla
Navicula hibernica
Navicula hilarula
Navicula hilliardi
Navicula hilliardii
Navicula hintzii
Navicula hirudo
Navicula hitchcocki
Navicula hochstetteri
Navicula hochstetteriana
Navicula hodgeana
Navicula hoefleri
Navicula hoeflerii
Navicula hoffmannii
Navicula hofmanniae
Navicula hollandica
Navicula hollerupensis
Navicula holmiensis
Navicula holstii
Navicula holubyi
Navicula homburgiana
Navicula hordeiformis
Navicula hornigii
Navicula horstii
Navicula hospes
Navicula huei
Navicula hugenottarum
Navicula humboldtiana
Navicula humerosa arabica
Navicula humjibreensis
Navicula hungarica
Navicula huniensis
Navicula husi
Navicula hustedtiana
Navicula hustedtii
Navicula hyalina
Navicula hyalina
Navicula hyalosira
Navicula hybrida
Navicula hyperborea
Navicula hyrtlii

I 

Navicula iasnitskii
Navicula iberica
Navicula icostauron 
Navicula ignobilis 
Navicula ignota
Navicula ikari
Navicula illicita
Navicula illinoensis
Navicula illustra
Navicula illustris
Navicula ilopangoensis 
Navicula imbecilla 
Navicula imbellis
Navicula impangenica
Navicula imperfecta
Navicula imperialis
Navicula impertila
Navicula impexa
Navicula implana
Navicula impossibilis
Navicula impressa
Navicula inattigens
Navicula incarum
Navicula incisa
Navicula inclinata
Navicula includens 
Navicula incognita 
Navicula incomitatus 
Navicula incomperta 
Navicula incomposita
Navicula incongruens
Navicula incudiformis
Navicula inculta 
Navicula incurva
Navicula incus
Navicula indefinita
Navicula indemnis
Navicula index 
Navicula indianensis
Navicula indica
Navicula indigens
Navicula inducens
Navicula indulgens
Navicula inelegans 
Navicula inexacta
Navicula inexpectans 
Navicula inexplorata
Navicula infaceta 
Navicula infirma 
Navicula infirmata
Navicula infirmitata 
Navicula inflasa
Navicula inflata
Navicula inflatoides
Navicula inflexa
Navicula infrenis 
Navicula ingapirca
Navicula ingens
Navicula ingenua 
Navicula ingoldii
Navicula ingrata
Navicula ingstadii
Navicula ingustata 
Navicula inhalata
Navicula inhalata
Navicula injusta
Navicula innommata
Navicula inornata
Navicula inpunctata
Navicula inquisitor
Navicula inscendens
Navicula insepta
Navicula insequens 
Navicula inserata 
Navicula inseriata 
Navicula insignificans
Navicula insignis
Navicula insignita
Navicula insociabilis 
Navicula insolita
Navicula insolubilis
Navicula insularis
Navicula insulsa
Navicula insuta
Navicula intacta
Navicula integra
Navicula intercedens
Navicula interglacialis
Navicula interlineata
Navicula intermedia 
Navicula intermixta 
Navicula interrupta
Navicula interruptestriata
Navicula intractata 
Navicula intricata
Navicula inutilis 
Navicula invenusta
Navicula inversa
Navicula invicta 
Navicula invisitata
Navicula involata 
Navicula involuta
Navicula iota
Navicula iranensis
Navicula irata
Navicula ireneae
Navicula iridis
Navicula irmengardis
Navicula irregularis
Navicula irreversa
Navicula irritans
Navicula irrorata
Navicula irroratoides
Navicula isabelensiformis
Navicula isabelensiminor
Navicula isabelensis 
Navicula isabelensoides 
Navicula iserentantii
Navicula isertii
Navicula islandica
Navicula isocephala
Navicula isostauron
Navicula iversenii
Navicula ivigtutensis 
Navicula izsopallagae

J 

Navicula jacobii
Navicula jacotiae
Navicula jaernefeltioides
Navicula jakkalsica
Navicula jakovljevici
Navicula jakovljevicii 
Navicula jamaicensis
Navicula jasnitskii
Navicula jasnitskyi
Navicula jatobensis
Navicula javanensis
Navicula javanica
Navicula jeffreyae
Navicula jejuna
Navicula jejunoides
Navicula jejunoides
Navicula jenneri
Navicula jentzschii
Navicula jequitinhonhae
Navicula jessenii
Navicula jimboi
Navicula jogensis
Navicula johanrossii
Navicula johnsonii
Navicula jonssoni
Navicula jonssonii
Navicula jordani
Navicula josephi
Navicula joubaudi
Navicula joubaudii
Navicula joursacensis
Navicula jouseana
Navicula juanitalinda
Navicula juba
Navicula jucunda
Navicula jucunda
Navicula jugata
Navicula julieni
Navicula jungi
Navicula jungii
Navicula jurassensis
Navicula jurgensii
Navicula jurilji

K 

Navicula kaapensis
Navicula kaelfvensis
Navicula kaikonkiensis
Navicula kamorthensis
Navicula kanemi
Navicula kanitzii
Navicula kantsiensis
Navicula kappa
Navicula karelica
Navicula kariana
Navicula karsia
Navicula karstenii
Navicula kawamurae
Navicula kefvingensis
Navicula kelleri
Navicula kenon
Navicula kenyae
Navicula kepesii
Navicula kerguelensis
Navicula kernensis
Navicula kertschiana
Navicula kincaidii
Navicula kinkeriana
Navicula kinkerii
Navicula kirchneriana
Navicula kisber
Navicula kittoniana
Navicula kizakensis
Navicula kjellmanii
Navicula klavsenii
Navicula kleerekoperi
Navicula knysnensis
Navicula knysnesis
Navicula kochii
Navicula koeiei
Navicula kohlenbachii
Navicula kohlmaieri
Navicula kolbei
Navicula kolentiensis
Navicula kolugoensis
Navicula koniamboensis
Navicula konstantini
Navicula korzeniewskii
Navicula kossuthii
Navicula kotschii
Navicula kotschyana
Navicula kotschyi
Navicula kovalchookiana
Navicula kpongensis
Navicula krammerae
Navicula krasskei
Navicula krookii
Navicula kryokonites
Navicula kryophila
Navicula kuetzingiana
Navicula kuetzingii
Navicula kuolensis
Navicula kuripanensis
Navicula kurzii
Navicula kuseliana
Navicula kutzingiana
Navicula kuusamensis
Navicula kuwaitiana
Navicula kwamkuji
Navicula laciniosa

L 

Navicula laciniosa
Navicula lacrimans
Navicula lacrymans
Navicula lacuna
Navicula lacunarum
Navicula lacunicola
Navicula lacus-karluki
Navicula lacus-baicali
Navicula lacus-lemani
Navicula lacustris
Navicula ladogensis
Navicula laevimarginata
Navicula laevis
Navicula laevissima
Navicula lagerheimii
Navicula lagerstedti
Navicula lagunae
Navicula laingii
Navicula lalia
Navicula lambda
Navicula lambertensis
Navicula lamella
Navicula lamii
Navicula lampra
Navicula lamprocampa
Navicula lanceolata
Navicula langoraensis
Navicula lapidosa
Navicula lapila
Navicula lapsa
Navicula lata
Navicula latefasciata
Navicula latelongitudinalis
Navicula lateropunctata
Navicula laterostrata
Navicula latevittata
Navicula laticeps
Navicula latissima
Navicula lauca
Navicula lauta
Navicula lawsonii
Navicula le-tourneurii
Navicula leboimei
Navicula leemanniae
Navicula lefevrei
Navicula legumen
Navicula lehmanniae
Navicula leistikowii
Navicula lemmermanni
Navicula lemmermannii
Navicula lenis
Navicula lenoblei
Navicula lenticula
Navicula lenzi
Navicula leonardi
Navicula leonardii
Navicula leonis
Navicula lepida
Navicula lepta
Navicula leptoceros
Navicula leptoloba
Navicula leptorhynchus
Navicula leptostigma
Navicula leptostriata
Navicula leptostylus
Navicula leptotermia
Navicula lesinensis
Navicula lesothensis
Navicula letulenta
Navicula leudugeri
Navicula levanderi
Navicula leveillei
Navicula levensis
Navicula levis
Navicula liaotungiensis
Navicula libellus
Navicula liber
Navicula libonensis
Navicula liburnica
Navicula lignieri
Navicula limanense
Navicula limata 
Navicula limatoides 
Navicula limbata
Navicula limicola 
Navicula limitanea
Navicula limosa
Navicula limpida
Navicula lindae 
Navicula lineola
Navicula lineostriata
Navicula linter 
Navicula liostauron
Navicula liouvillei 
Navicula lirata
Navicula lithognatha
Navicula lithognathoides
Navicula litoris
Navicula litos
Navicula littoralis
Navicula ljugneri
Navicula ljungneri
Navicula lobata
Navicula loczyi
Navicula lohmannii 
Navicula loibl-sittlerii
Navicula lomastriata
Navicula londonensis
Navicula longa
Navicula longi
Navicula longicephala
Navicula longifissa
Navicula longirostris
Navicula longistriata 
Navicula lorcana 
Navicula lorenzii 
Navicula lovenii 
Navicula loveridgei
Navicula lubetii
Navicula lucenoides 
Navicula lucentiformis
Navicula luciae A.Witkowski
Navicula luciana
Navicula lucida
Navicula lucidula
Navicula lucifica
Navicula ludloviana
Navicula luisii
Navicula lumbricastriata
Navicula lumen
Navicula lunata
Navicula lunatapicalis
Navicula lundii
Navicula lundstroemii
Navicula lunula
Navicula lunulifera
Navicula lunyacsekii
Navicula lupula
Navicula lurinda
Navicula lusitanica
Navicula lusoria
Navicula luxoriensis
Navicula luxuriosa
Navicula luzonensis
Navicula lybica
Navicula lyra
Navicula lyrans
Navicula lyrella
Navicula lyrigera
Navicula lyroides

M 

Navicula macdonaghi
Navicula macer
Navicula maceria 
Navicula macilenta
Navicula macraeana
Navicula macrogongyla
Navicula macromphala 
Navicula macropunctata 
Navicula macula
Navicula maculata
Navicula maculosa
Navicula madagascarensis
Navicula madagascariensis
Navicula madeirensis
Navicula madrae 
Navicula maeandriana
Navicula maeandrinoides
Navicula maendrina
Navicula maeotica
Navicula magapolitana 
Navicula magellanica  
Navicula magna
Navicula magnifica
Navicula maharashtrensis
Navicula mahoodii 
Navicula maidanae
Navicula major
Navicula malacarae
Navicula maliana
Navicula malica 
Navicula malinvaudi
Navicula malombensis
Navicula malutiana
Navicula mammalis
Navicula manapiensis
Navicula manginii
Navicula manifesta
Navicula mannii
Navicula manokwariensis
Navicula mansiensis
Navicula mantichora
Navicula manubialis
Navicula mardansouensis
Navicula margalithii
Navicula margarita  
Navicula margaritacea
Navicula margaritata
Navicula margaritiana 
Navicula marginata 
Navicula marginestriata
Navicula margino-nodularis
Navicula margino-ornata
Navicula marginulata
Navicula maria 
Navicula mariagracielae 
Navicula mariposae
Navicula marlieri
Navicula marlierii 
Navicula marmorata
Navicula marnieri
Navicula marnierii
Navicula martini
Navicula martinii
Navicula martyi
Navicula mascarenae
Navicula mastogloidea
Navicula mauleri
Navicula mauriciana
Navicula maxima
Navicula mayeri
Navicula meadeensis 
Navicula meadensis 
Navicula mediacomplexa
Navicula mediahelos 
Navicula medica 
Navicula medioconvexa 
Navicula mediocostata
Navicula mediocriformis
Navicula mediocris
Navicula medioincrassata 
Navicula medioinflata
Navicula mediopartita
Navicula mediopunctata 
Navicula mediterranea
Navicula megacuspidata
Navicula megalodon 
Navicula megaloptera
Navicula megapolitana
Navicula megastauros 
Navicula meisteri
Navicula meisterii
Navicula melanesica
Navicula melchersi
Navicula meleagris
Navicula menaiana 
Navicula menda
Navicula mendica
Navicula mengeae 
Navicula menilitica
Navicula meniscoides 
Navicula menisculoides
Navicula menisculus
Navicula meniscus 
Navicula mentzii
Navicula mereschkowskyi 
Navicula meridiepacifica 
Navicula meridionalis
Navicula meridiorecens
Navicula mersa
Navicula mesogongyla
Navicula mesolaia
Navicula mesoleiae
Navicula mesolepta
Navicula mesopachya
Navicula mexicana 
Navicula meyeri
Navicula mica 
Navicula microcari
Navicula microcephala
Navicula microdicta
Navicula microdigitoradiata
Navicula microlyra
Navicula micropupula
Navicula microrhombus
Navicula microrhynchus
Navicula microstauron
Navicula microstoma
Navicula migma 
Navicula mikado
Navicula mikrotatos
Navicula millotiana 
Navicula millsi
Navicula milthersii 
Navicula mimicans
Navicula mimula 
Navicula mina
Navicula minima
Navicula miniscula
Navicula minisculoides
Navicula minnewaukonensis
Navicula minor
Navicula minthe 
Navicula mintracta
Navicula minuscula
Navicula minuta
Navicula minutissima 
Navicula minutula 
Navicula mira 
Navicula mirabilis 
Navicula mirabunda 
Navicula miramaris
Navicula mirifica 
Navicula misella
Navicula misionera
Navicula mobiliensis 
Navicula mocsarensis
Navicula modesta
Navicula modica 
Navicula moendrina
Navicula moenofranconica 
Navicula moerckii 
Navicula moesta
Navicula moesziana
Navicula molesta
Navicula mollicula
Navicula mollis
Navicula mollissima 
Navicula monela
Navicula monile
Navicula monilifera 
Navicula moniliformis
Navicula monmouthiana
Navicula monmouthianastodderi
Navicula monodi 
Navicula monodon 
Navicula monradii
Navicula montana 
Navicula montanestris
Navicula montisatrae
Navicula mooreana
Navicula moorosiana
Navicula moreii
Navicula mormonorum 
Navicula morricei 
Navicula moscarensis 
Navicula moskalii 
Navicula mossbergensis
Navicula mournei
Navicula mucicola
Navicula mucicoloides 
Navicula mucronula
Navicula muelleri
Navicula mugadensis
Navicula mujibensis
Navicula multicostata
Navicula multicostata
Navicula multigramme
Navicula multiperla
Navicula multiplex
Navicula multiseriata
Navicula multistriata 
Navicula muncki 
Navicula munckii 
Navicula munda 
Navicula muralibionta 
Navicula muraliformis
Navicula muralis 
Navicula murrayi 
Navicula musca 
Navicula muscaeformis
Navicula muscatinei 
Navicula muscerda
Navicula muscosa
Navicula mutabilis
Navicula mutat 
Navicula mutica 
Navicula muticopsiforme
Navicula muticopsis
Navicula my

N 

Navicula nadjae
Navicula namibica
Navicula nanissima
Navicula nansenii
Navicula narinosa
Navicula neglecta
Navicula neglecta
Navicula nemoris
Navicula neomundana
Navicula neoreversa
Navicula neoventricosa
Navicula nepouiana
Navicula nevrovae
Navicula niceaencis
Navicula nienta
Navicula nimbus
Navicula nobilis
Navicula norae
Navicula nordenskioeldii
Navicula normalis
Navicula normaloides
Navicula northumbrica
Navicula notanda
Navicula notha
Navicula novae-guineaensis
Navicula novaesiberica
Navicula novasiberica
Navicula nuda
Navicula nugalis
Navicula nungaensis

O 

Navicula oahuensis
Navicula obesa
Navicula objecta
Navicula oblonga
Navicula oblongata
Navicula oblongiformis
Navicula obtecta
Navicula obtusangula
Navicula ocalli
Navicula octavosignata
Navicula odiosa
Navicula oerensis
Navicula oetzvallensis
Navicula ognjanovae
Navicula ohiensis
Navicula okunoi
Navicula oliffi
Navicula oligotraphenta
Navicula onoensis
Navicula opieorum
Navicula opima
Navicula opportuna
Navicula oppugnata
Navicula orangiana
Navicula orbiculata
Navicula orbis
Navicula orvinii
Navicula ostenfeldii
Navicula ostrogothica
Navicula ovalis
Navicula ovata

P 

Navicula paanaensis
Navicula paca
Navicula pacardi
Navicula pagophila
Navicula palearctica
Navicula pallescens
Navicula palpebralis
Navicula pampaeana
Navicula papilioarea
Navicula parabilis
Navicula parablis
Navicula parabryophila
Navicula paracari
Navicula parahasta
Navicula paranipponica
Navicula paraobesa
Navicula parapontica
Navicula parastriolata
Navicula parasura
Navicula paratunkae
Navicula parca
Navicula parenculoides
Navicula pargemina
Navicula parinacota
Navicula parodia
Navicula parvipenda
Navicula parvula
Navicula patula
Navicula paucivisitata
Navicula paulensis
Navicula paul-schulzii
Navicula paupercula
Navicula pavillardi
Navicula pavillardii
Navicula pelagica
Navicula peltoensis
Navicula pennata
Navicula peracuta
Navicula peragalli
Navicula peregrina
Navicula peregrinopsis
Navicula peripontica
Navicula perlatoides
Navicula perlepida
Navicula permakarevichae
Navicula perminuta
Navicula perobesa
Navicula peroblonga
Navicula perotii
Navicula perparva
Navicula perpendicularis
Navicula perpicea
Navicula perrhombus
Navicula perspicilliata
Navicula perturbata
Navicula petersenii
Navicula peticolasii
Navicula petrmarvanii
Navicula petrovii
Navicula petrovskae
Navicula phyllepta
Navicula phylleptosoma
Navicula phylleptosomaformis
Navicula picea
Navicula piercei
Navicula pierre-comperei
Navicula pinna
Navicula pinnata
Navicula planiceps
Navicula planmembranacea
Navicula platalea
Navicula platensis
Navicula plathii
Navicula platycephala
Navicula platystoma
Navicula platyventris
Navicula pletura
Navicula podolica
Navicula podzorskii
Navicula polae
Navicula polysticta
Navicula ponticulus
Navicula poretzkiae
Navicula porifera
Navicula porta-aurata
Navicula portomontana
Navicula potzgeri
Navicula praeterita
Navicula pragma
Navicula prespanensis
Navicula prinslooii
Navicula producta
Navicula psendoacceptata
Navicula pseudislandica
Navicula pseudoanglica
Navicula pseudoannulata
Navicula pseudoantonii
Navicula pseudoarvensis
Navicula pseudobrasiliana
Navicula pseudobrebissonii
Navicula pseudobryophila
Navicula pseudocarinifera
Navicula pseudoclamans
Navicula pseudoclavata
Navicula pseudoclementis
Navicula pseudoconcamerata
Navicula pseudocryptocephala
Navicula pseudodemerarae
Navicula pseudofaceta
Navicula pseudofossalis
Navicula pseudofrickia
Navicula pseudofrugalis
Navicula pseudoglacialis
Navicula pseudogrimmei
Navicula pseudohasta
Navicula pseudohastata
Navicula pseudohumilis
Navicula pseudojacobii
Navicula pseudokryokonites
Navicula pseudolagerheimii
Navicula pseudolanceolata
Navicula pseudolinearis
Navicula pseudolitoricola
Navicula pseudolucidula
Navicula pseudomenisculus
Navicula pseudoorthoneoides
Navicula pseudopalpebralis
Navicula pseudopelliculosa
Navicula pseudoppugnata
Navicula pseudoreinhardtii
Navicula pseudosalinarioides
Navicula pseudo-schoenfeldii
Navicula pseudosilicula
Navicula pseudostrearia
Navicula pseudostundii
Navicula pseudotenelloides
Navicula pseudotenelloides
Navicula pseudotenelloides
Navicula pseudothienemannii
Navicula pulchripora
Navicula pungens
Navicula pusilloides

Q-R 

Navicula quadrisinuata
Navicula quadriundulata
Navicula quasidisjuncta
Navicula quaternaria
Navicula quechua
Navicula quincunx
Navicula quinquenodis
Navicula radians
Navicula radiopunctata
Navicula radiosa
Navicula radiosafallax
Navicula radiosiola
Navicula radiostriata
Navicula rainierensis
Navicula rajmundii
Navicula rakowskae
Navicula ramosissima
Navicula raphoneis
Navicula ravinae
Navicula recava
Navicula recens
Navicula recognita
Navicula recondita
Navicula rectiformis
Navicula rectum
Navicula regata
Navicula regelli
Navicula regressa
Navicula reichardtiana
Navicula reimeri
Navicula reinhardtii
Navicula reinickeana
Navicula reissii
Navicula relicta
Navicula resecta
Navicula restitua
Navicula restituta
Navicula retusa
Navicula rhodana
Navicula rhombica
Navicula rhynchocephala
Navicula rhynchotella
Navicula ricardae
Navicula ricardii
Navicula ridelii
Navicula riediana
Navicula riotecensis
Navicula rivalis
Navicula rivularis
Navicula rivulorum
Navicula rogalli
Navicula rolandii
Navicula rossii
Navicula rotaeana
Navicula rotaena
Navicula rotula
Navicula ruga
Navicula rumaniensis
Navicula rusticensis

S 

Navicula sabae
Navicula sabiniana
Navicula sacrophagus
Navicula sagitta
Navicula salinarum
Navicula salinicola
Navicula sanctacrux
Navicula sanctaecrucis
Navicula sancti-naumii
Navicula sandegrinii
Navicula sansegana
Navicula sarolata
Navicula saugerii
Navicula savannahiana
Navicula scalifera
Navicula scandinavica
Navicula scaniae
Navicula schadei
Navicula schaeferi
Navicula schassmanii
Navicula schassmannii
Navicula schefterae
Navicula schmassmannii
Navicula schmidtii
Navicula schonfeldii
Navicula schonkenii
Navicula schroeteri
Navicula schubartii
Navicula schultzei
Navicula schwabei
Navicula schweigeri
Navicula scirpus
Navicula scoliopleuroides
Navicula scoresbyi
Navicula scotica
Navicula scutelloides
Navicula scutum
Navicula seductilis
Navicula seibigiana
Navicula seibigii
Navicula seippiana
Navicula sejuncta
Navicula semen
Navicula semenicula
Navicula semenoides
Navicula semiaperta
Navicula semiarea
Navicula semihyalina
Navicula seminoides
Navicula seminuloides
Navicula semivirgata
Navicula senegalensis
Navicula septaeoides
Navicula septenaria
Navicula septentrionalis
Navicula sequens
Navicula serdicensis
Navicula serotina
Navicula shanwangensis
Navicula shiloi
Navicula siamexilis
Navicula siamlinearis
Navicula sibirica
Navicula sieminskiae
Navicula sigma
Navicula silenda
Navicula silens
Navicula simplex
Navicula simplexoides
Navicula simula
Navicula simulans
Navicula singularis
Navicula siofokensis
Navicula sjoersii
Navicula skabitchewskyayae
Navicula skabitschewskyi
Navicula skiftei
Navicula skuae
Navicula slesvicensis
Navicula slesvicensus
Navicula smeerenburgensis
Navicula smithii
Navicula söhrensis
Navicula solaris
Navicula solida
Navicula sorella
Navicula sovereignae
Navicula sovereignii
Navicula spartinetensis
Navicula sphaerophora
Navicula spirata
Navicula splendicula
Navicula sponsa
Navicula spuria
Navicula stachurae
Navicula staffordiae
Navicula stankovicii
Navicula starmachii
Navicula starmachioides
Navicula staurifera
Navicula stercumuscarum
Navicula stesvicensis
Navicula stigmatifera
Navicula stoermeri
Navicula strangulata
Navicula streckerae
Navicula strelnikovae
Navicula strenzkii
Navicula striolata
Navicula structa
Navicula stuxbergii
Navicula subacuta
Navicula subadnata
Navicula subajajensis
Navicula subalpina
Navicula sub-bacillum
Navicula subbotnica
Navicula subbottnica
Navicula subcancellata
Navicula subclementis
Navicula subconcentrica
Navicula subdelicata
Navicula subelata
Navicula subfasciata
Navicula subfortis
Navicula subfossalis
Navicula subfraudulenta
Navicula subfrigidicola
Navicula subgastriformis
Navicula subgrimmei
Navicula subhasta
Navicula subhastatula
Navicula subhexagona
Navicula subinflatoides
Navicula sublanceolata
Navicula subnympharum
Navicula subocculata
Navicula subocculta
Navicula subplacentula
Navicula subretusa
Navicula subrhynchocephala
Navicula subrotundata
Navicula subsulcata
Navicula subtrophicatrix
Navicula subviridula
Navicula sudora
Navicula suecicarum
Navicula supergregaria
Navicula superhasta
Navicula supleeorum
Navicula supralitoralis
Navicula suprinii
Navicula suriana
Navicula surinamensis
Navicula suspica
Navicula sverdrupii
Navicula swaniana
Navicula symmetrica
Navicula syvertsenii
Navicula szlachetkoi

T 

Navicula taedens
Navicula tairuaensis
Navicula tamnaeana
Navicula tanakae
Navicula tantula
Navicula taylorii
Navicula temniskovae
Navicula tenelloides
Navicula tenuicephala
Navicula tenuipunctata
Navicula tenuis
Navicula termes
Navicula terricola
Navicula tersa
Navicula testa
Navicula testata
Navicula texana
Navicula theelii
Navicula theinemannii
Navicula thienemannii
Navicula thiennemanii
Navicula thoroddsenii
Navicula tibetica
Navicula toba
Navicula torellii
Navicula torganae
Navicula torneensis
Navicula toulaae
Navicula toxa
Navicula tracery
Navicula tranciloba
Navicula transistantioides
Navicula transitans
Navicula tranversa
Navicula traucilola
Navicula triconfusa
Navicula tridentula
Navicula trigonocephala
Navicula trilatera
Navicula triumvirorum
Navicula trivialis
Navicula trochus
Navicula trophicatrix
Navicula tropicoidea
Navicula tsetsegmaae
Navicula tubulosa
Navicula turris
Navicula tuulensis
Navicula tuzoni
Navicula twymania
Navicula twymanniana

U-V 

Navicula udintsevii
Navicula ultratenelloides
Navicula umbra
Navicula umkantziensis
Navicula undosa
Navicula undulata
Navicula undulata
Navicula unilaterarea
Navicula uniseriata
Navicula usoltsevae
Navicula utermoehlii
Navicula utlandshoerniensis
Navicula vacillans
Navicula vahlii
Navicula valdestriata
Navicula valdicostata
Navicula valeriana
Navicula validicostata
Navicula vandamii
Navicula vaneei
Navicula vanei
Navicula vanhoeffenii
Navicula vanmeeli
Navicula vara
Navicula varians
Navicula variolinea
Navicula vaupelli
Navicula vekhovii
Navicula venerablis
Navicula venetiformis
Navicula venetoides
Navicula ventricosa
Navicula verecundoides
Navicula vetita
Navicula vicina
Navicula vilaplanii
Navicula viminea
Navicula virgata
Navicula viridis
Navicula viridis
Navicula viridula
Navicula viridulacalcis
Navicula virihensis
Navicula virosa
Navicula vixcylindrata
Navicula vula
Navicula vulpina

W-Z 

Navicula waernensis
Navicula walkeri
Navicula wardii
Navicula wasmundii
Navicula weberi
Navicula wendlingii
Navicula wetzelii
Navicula whitefishensis
Navicula wiesneri
Navicula wilczekii
Navicula wildii
Navicula willisiae
Navicula winona
Navicula wisei
Navicula woltereckii
Navicula worochinii
Navicula wrightii
Navicula wulfii
Navicula wunsamiae
Navicula wygaschii
Navicula yaarensis
Navicula zachariasii
Navicula zanonii
Navicula zeta
Navicula zichyi
Navicula zohdyi
Navicula zostereti
Navicula zsivnyana

References

Further reading
 
 

Lists of algae
Taxonomic lists (species)